Eacles manuelita is a moth in the family Saturniidae. It is found in Brazil.

References

Ceratocampinae
Moths described in 1941